Anne Kirsten Eisenträger is a professor of mathematics at The Pennsylvania State University, known for her research on computational number theory, Hilbert's tenth problem, and applications in cryptography.

Eisenträger earned a Vordiplom in mathematics in 1996 from the University of Tübingen and a Master's degree (1998) and a Ph.D. (2003) from the University of California, Berkeley; her dissertation, entitled Hilbert’s Tenth Problem and Arithmetic Geometry, was supervised by Bjorn Poonen. After temporary positions at the Institute for Advanced Study and the University of Michigan, she joined the Pennsylvania State University faculty in 2007.

Eisenträger appears in the documentary film Julia Robinson and Hilbert's Tenth Problem (2008). In 2017, she became a Fellow of the American Mathematical Society "for contributions to computational number theory and number-theoretic undecidability".

References

External links
Home page

Year of birth missing (living people)
Living people
20th-century German mathematicians
21st-century American mathematicians
American women mathematicians
Number theorists
University of Tübingen alumni
University of California, Berkeley alumni
Pennsylvania State University faculty
Fellows of the American Mathematical Society
Place of birth missing (living people)
21st-century women mathematicians
21st-century American women